Li Ngai Hoi (born on 15 October 1994 in Hong Kong), is a Hong Kong professional footballer who currently plays as a centre back for Chinese Super League club Nantong Zhiyun.

Early career
Li was a student of Yan Chai Hospital Tung Chi Ying Memorial Secondary School and is under their youth football academy scheme with Kitchee. He also plays for the school's football team.

Club career
Li trained with English Premier League club Aston Villa after winning the Be A Pro competition organised by the club and Nike in August 2011. Li was promoted from the youth system of Kitchee in 2010. For the 2011–12 season, he was loaned to Hong Kong Sapling to gain more playing experiences. On 2 October 2011, Li made his debut for Hong Kong Sapling in the 2011–12 Hong Kong Senior Challenge Shield first round first leg away match against Tuen Mun.

In the 2012–13 season, Li joined Pegasus on a loan contract for an undisclosed fee. He returned to Kitchee at the end of the season. In July 2013, Li joined China Super League club Dalian Aerbin for trial. Later, Li joined fellow First Division club Southern on a season-long loan from Kitchee on 7 August 2013.

On 9 January 2018, Li was recalled by Kitchee ahead of their 2018 AFC Champions League campaign.

On 8 February 2021, Kitchee accepted Li's transfer request and stated that they would allow the player to leave immediately. Four days later, it was announced that Li had signed with China League One club Nantong Zhiyun for a transfer fee of RMB $1 million. He would go on to establish himself within the team and helped the club gain promotion to the top tier at the end of the 2022 China League One season.

Career statistics

Club
Statistics accurate as of match played 31 December 2022.

International

Honours

Club
Kitchee
 Hong Kong Premier League: 2017–18, 2019–20
 Hong Kong Senior Shield: 2018–19
 Hong Kong FA Cup: 2017–18, 2018–19
 Hong Kong Sapling Cup: 2019–20

References

External links

1994 births
Living people
Hong Kong footballers
Hong Kong international footballers
Hong Kong First Division League players
Hong Kong Premier League players
China League One players
Chinese Super League players
Dreams Sports Club players
Kitchee SC players
TSW Pegasus FC players
Southern District FC players
South China AA players
Nantong Zhiyun F.C. players
Hong Kong expatriate sportspeople in China
Hong Kong expatriate footballers
Expatriate footballers in China
Association football fullbacks
Association football defenders
Footballers at the 2014 Asian Games
Asian Games competitors for Hong Kong